William Bingham (1752–1804) was an American statesman, founder of the Bank of North America.

William or Billy Bingham may also refer to:

Billy Bingham (born 1931), Northern Irish former footballer
Billy Bingham (footballer, born 1990), English footballer
William Bingham (priest) (1743–1819), Archdeacon of London
William Bingham (Pittsburgh) (1808–1873), mayor of Pittsburgh during the 1850s
Bingo Bingham (William Horace Bingham, born 1885), American baseball player

See also